Luteusin A is an azaphilone monoamine oxidase inhibitor produced by Talaromyces luteus.

References 

Monoamine oxidase inhibitors
Isochromenes
Organochlorides